Carmen Soler (1924–1985) was a Paraguayan educator, poet and member of the Paraguayan Communist Party. She was born in Asunción on August 4, 1924 and died in Buenos Aires on November 19, 1985. She was imprisoned and exiled several times for fighting against the dictatorship of Alfredo Stroessner.

Early life and education
Born in Asunción, the capital of Paraguay, Soler attended primary and secondary there.

Career
After completing her studies and already married to Marcus Aurelius Aponte, she moved to Chaco where she worked as a bilingual rural schoolteacher. There she first encountered social problems such as villagers without land, and the extreme poverty in which the Indians lived.

Political militancy and poetry
In 1947, she joined the Febreristas, a socialist movement in which her brother, Miguel Angel Soler, was already active. She participated actively in the struggle against the dictator Moríñigo, wanting to address social inequalities that existed in the country.

After the Civil War of 1947, she was forced into exile in Buenos Aires, where she continued to contact the Febreristas Liberation Bloc, defending the Marxist positions within the movement.

It was in exile that she began to compose poems, in which she related the experiences of her life. In her poems are her aesthetic definitions, her commitment, her longing for her homeland. Those dated 1955, 1960 and 1968 contain her testimony from prison.

1924 births
1985 deaths
Paraguayan communists
Paraguayan women poets
People from Asunción
Paraguayan expatriates in Argentina
Paraguayan schoolteachers
Paraguayan women educators
20th-century Paraguayan poets
20th-century Paraguayan women writers
20th-century Paraguayan educators
Communist women writers